The Portsmouth and Southsea Synagogue, also known as the Portsmouth (and Southsea) Hebrew Congregation, is an Orthodox Jewish synagogue located in Elm Grove, Southsea in Portsmouth, England. It is one of the oldest Jewish congregations in England. It was founded c. 1747 and had a rabbinate of its own. During the Napoleonic wars, the commercial activity of Portsmouth as a garrison and naval town attracted a large number of Jews. In 1780, a synagogue was built in White's Row. In 1850 the synagogue was redecorated and in 1876 renovated.

History
The current Ashkenazi Orthodox Synagogue is located at Thicket House, Southsea. It was established in 1936 when a house was converted. Many of the fittings from the original 1780 Synagogue including the Ark are present in the current synagogue. The original Synagogue building, which until its closure in 1936 was the oldest provincial Synagogue still in use, was destroyed during the Second World War in an air raid.

In December 1942, a day of mourning, fasting was held in the Synagogue for Jewish victims of Nazi massacres. In 1967, in the light of the good relationship which existed between Portsmouth and the Israeli Navy based in Haifa, Israel the Synagogue donated a Kiddush cup to the crew of the Submarine INS Dakar for its maiden voyage which ended in tragedy when the Submarine sank.

The Synagogue still holds regular services according to the Ashkenazi Orthodox Nusach.

Rabbis
Reverend Gabriel Burns is currently the part-time leader of the Congregation.
 
Past rabbis have included Rabbi David H. Lincoln who was rabbi in 1965 and Reverend Isaac Philips who was rabbi in 1866 and served the congregation for fifty six years.

See also
List of places of worship in Portsmouth

References

External links
Synagogue homepage
Portsmouth and Southsea Hebrew Congregation on Jewish Communities and Records - UK (hosted by jewishgen.org).
Jacobs, J and Harris, I. 'Portsmouth,' ''Jewish Encyclopedia
Kushner, T and Knox, K. Refugees in an Age of Genocide, (Routledge 2001.), Pg. 33-149; 197

Ashkenazi Jewish culture in England
Ashkenazi synagogues
Religion in Hampshire
Religious buildings in Portsmouth
Orthodox synagogues in England
Religious buildings and structures in Hampshire